Auskick is a program designed to teach the basic skills of Australian rules football (AFL) to boys and girls aged between 5 and 12. Auskick is a non-contact variant of the sport. It began in Australia and is now a nationwide non-selective program. It has increased participation and diversity in the sport amongst children, and is now being run in many countries across the world.

At its peak in the mid-1990s in Australia there were around 200,000 Auskick participants annually and this figure has since stabilised at this number. Numerous professional, semi-professional and representative players are graduates.

The program is now run throughout the world, including several locally branded variations such as: "Kiwi Kick" (AFL New Zealand), "Niukick" (Papua New Guinea), "Footywild" (South Africa), "Bula Kick" (Fiji), "Viking Kick" (Denmark), "Ausball" (United States) and "Pikinini Kick" (Vanuatu) among others often sponsored by local organisations.

History 
Auskick has its roots in the Little League which began to be played at half time during VFL (now AFL) matches in the 1960s and was revised in 1980 to make it more accessible. Little League was expanded by Ray Allsop into a state development program called "Vickick" begun in Victoria in 1985. Participation increased from 7,000 to 35,000 in 4 years.

The ACT was one of the first other states or territories to introduce the program in 1991 as "Auskick". Between 1993 and 1995 former AFL player and coach David Parkin who had been coaching the territory's Teal Cup side successfully lobbied the AFL for the national adoption of Auskick.

In 1998, the AFL Commission, the national governing body for the sport, began to roll it out nationally. At its peak there were around 200,000 Auskick participants annually. As the world governing body, the Commission later franchised the program to affiliated organisations around the world under various local brands and sponsors.

Auskick sessions 
Auskick is a national football coaching network, with clinics held weekly (usually on Saturday mornings) run by volunteers. The program attracts over 100,000 primary school aged participants annually and, as such, is the largest grassroots sporting association of its kind in Australia.

Each Auskick session consists of a training session and a game, with the emphasis on developing skills rather than the game result. Some of the major rule differences from Australian rules football are a ban on tackling and the restriction of players to their zone of the field, similar to netball.

The AFL is a major supporter of Auskick and star players occasionally assist in training events. The AFL also invites various branches of the Auskick network to play short games during the half-time breaks of premiership season games at all grounds, with numerous matches played on modified fields simultaneously.

In 2007 the program's slogan was "Where Champions Begin", with Jo Silvagni (wife of  former AFL player Stephen Silvagni) and Robert DiPierdomenico, the 1986 co-Brownlow Medallist as the main ambassadors.  They also used the kick-to-kick tradition as part of their promotional television campaign, which shows kids from around the country kicking the football to each other to the tune of "Gimme Dat Ding".

Parents' role in Auskick

Parents are involved across the board in activities such as at skills sessions, as coaches and supervisors, administrators, helpers, coordinators and first aid officers. Throughout the year, there are parent orientation courses as well as coaching courses.

Auskick in non-traditional Australian rules football regions 

The AFL has used the Auskick program the introduce Australian rules football into schools and communities around the country to increase the AFL's profile in areas that traditionally support other football codes such as New South Wales and Queensland. However there have been accusations of exaggerated participation figures in an attempts to gain access to Sydney playing fields. Vast increases in AFL participation figures in Sydney were questioned by David Lawson, a Melbourne University academic, in a study commission by the AFL. Lawson's study found that AFL club participation rates in Sydney had stalled, and that the AFL was masking low figures by using short term, non-club affiliated Auskick participants and comparing them to competitive junior club participation numbers in other sports.

Ambassadors
Early on in the national program, national ambassadors were nominated. All of these ambassadors played for Victorian clubs and as the AFL and the program continued to expand nationally, these players were not always well recognised figures by children in all regions.
In 2010s each state nominating its own ambassador, usually a home grown talent, without a national ambassador.

National 
 Shane Crawford (2012)
 Robert Dipierdomenico (2009-2010; 2011) 
 Joel Selwood (2008)
 Robert Dipierdomenico & Jo Silvagni (2007)

Australian Marketing Campaigns
 "NAB AFL Mini Legends" (2016-)
 "More Give, Less Take" (2012)
 "Let It Shine" (2009)
 "Follow Every Rainbow" (2008)
 "Gimme That Thing" (2007)
 "Where Champions Begin" (2007)

Sponsors

Australia
 National Australia Bank (2006-) as "NAB AFL Auskick"
 Simpson (Past ?-?)
 McDonald's (1998-?)

Outside Australia
Outside Australia, Auskick programs exist in the following countries:
 
 
 

Auskick exists under a different name in the following countries:
  (Viking Kick)
  (Bulakick)
  (Kiwi Kick)
  (Niukick)
  (Solkick)
  (Footy Wild)
  (Ausball)
  (Pikinini Kick)

References

Notes

External links
AFL Auskick

Australian rules football in Australia
Children's sport
Sports originating in Australia
Youth sport in Australia